Samuel Clement Fessenden (March 7, 1815 – April 18, 1882) was an American  abolitionist and United States Congressman from Maine.


Early life and education
Born in New Gloucester, Massachusetts (now in Maine), Samuel Fessenden graduated from Bowdoin College in 1834 and from Bangor Theological Seminary in 1837.

Family
Samuel Clement Fessenden was the son of prominent abolitionist Samuel Fessenden and brother of Treasury Secretary William Pitt Fessenden and Congressman T. A. D. Fessenden. He was an uncle of Union Army generals Francis Fessenden and James D. Fessenden.

Samuel Clement's son Joshua Abbe Fessenden, who was born in Rockland, Maine, served in the United States Cavalry beginning in 1862 and was wounded at the Battle of Chickamauga. His other son Samuel, also orn in Rockland, was appointed 2nd lieutenant in the 5th Maine battery on January 18, 1865 and was a lawyer and politician in Stamford, Connecticut.

Career
He was ordained and installed as pastor of the Second Congregational Church of Thomaston, Maine from 1837 to 1856. He then established the Maine Evangelist and began to study law. He was admitted to the bar and began practicing in 1858, eventually becoming judge of the Rockland municipal court.

He was elected as a Republican to the 37th Congress, serving from March 4, 1861 to March 3, 1863. During his time as a congressman, he continued to be a staunch Unionist and opponent of slavery. After leaving office, he served as an examiner in the United States Patent Office from 1865 to 1879 and then the United States consul at Saint John, New Brunswick from 1879 to 1881.

Death
Fessenden died in Stamford, Connecticut in 1882. He is buried in Evergreen Cemetery in Portland, Maine.

References

External links
 

1815 births
1882 deaths
People of Maine in the American Civil War
Bowdoin College alumni
People from New Gloucester, Maine
American Congregationalists
Fessenden family
Burials at Evergreen Cemetery (Portland, Maine)
People from Thomaston, Maine
Bangor Theological Seminary alumni
Republican Party members of the United States House of Representatives from Maine
19th-century American politicians